Donald Ernest Cameron McKechnie (23 March 1944 – 10 August 2021) was a New Zealand cricketer and umpire. 

A left-arm spin bowler, McKechnie played 17 first-class matches for Otago between 1975 and 1981. His most successful match was against Auckland in 1975–76, when he took 3 for 71 and 6 for 65 and Otago won by 10 runs. He won the player of the match award in the low-scoring match against Wellington in 1976–77 when he took six wickets and three catches and top-scored in Otago's first innings with 27 batting at number nine. 

Later, McKechnie became an umpire, officiating in eight first-class matches between 1986 and 1990. He died in Balclutha on 10 August 2021.

See also
 List of Otago representative cricketers

References

External links
 

1944 births
2021 deaths
New Zealand cricketers
Otago cricketers
Cricketers from Dunedin
New Zealand cricket umpires